The 2014 Judo Grand Slam Abu Dhabi was held in Abu Dhabi, United Arab Emirates, from 31 October to 2 November 2014.

Medal summary

Men's events

Women's events

Source Results

Medal table

References

External links
 

2014 IJF World Tour
2014 Judo Grand Slam
Judo
Grand Slam Abu Dhabi 2014
Judo
Judo
Judo